Harshini Mukundan is an Indian-American microbiologist. She is a Fellow of the American Association for the Advancement of Science.

Life 
She grew up in India. Mukundan received her Bachelor's of Science Degree in Microbiology from the University of Delhi in 1995. In 1997, she earned in Master's Degree in Microbiology from Barkatullah University and then went on to complete her Ph.D. in Biomedical Sciences from the University of New Mexico School of Medicine.

From 2006, she worked at Los Alamos National Laboratory. Her work focuses on developing tools for detecting infectious diseases.

She appeared in “Mission Unstoppable”.

References 

Living people
American microbiologists
Women microbiologists
Indian emigrants to the United States
Delhi University alumni
Barkatullah University alumni
University of New Mexico alumni
Los Alamos National Laboratory personnel
Year of birth missing (living people)
Fellows of the American Association for the Advancement of Science